The 73 class is a diesel-hydraulic locomotive built by Walkers Limited, Maryborough for the New South Wales Department of Railways between 1970 and 1973.

History

The New South Wales Department of Railways placed an order in October 1969 with Walkers Limited, Maryborough for 20 B-B shunting locomotives. These were the only New South Wales locomotives to be built in Queensland.

Delivery
The first unit was delivered in October 1970. When the whole of the first order had arrived, all steam shunting on the North Coast line and the Sydney Metropolitan area, as well as at Goulburn had been replaced. In July 1971 a further 30 units were ordered. The last of these arrived in March 1973 and this brought to an end all remaining steam shunting operations in New South Wales.

In traffic
The New South Wales Department of Railways purchased the class mainly for shunting and their prohibition from mainline use was 'officially' due to the lack of vigilance controls. However, despite its absence, the class was still seen on many suburban trip workings and when mainline operation was a necessity, there seemed to be no hesitation to use them.

One advantage a diesel-hydraulic locomotive has over a diesel-electric variety is its ability to negotiate up to 300mm of water over the tracks. Big floods in March 1976 gave 7323 an opportunity to show off its swimming ability when water covered the line near Bourke and this locomotive was used on a couple of freight trains and a ballast train from Nyngan to Bourke and return. At least two other occasions when their water resistance was put to use was Menindee in 1976 and Hexham in 1977.

Multiple unit operation was common, although the flood event at Hexham is the only known occurrence of triple-heading. A number of units were fitted with exhaust gas scrubbers for use on Eastern Suburbs Railway construction in the 1970s.

Depot allocation
As an example of the spread of the members of the class throughout the system, the fleet was allocated as follows as at 30 August 1977:

Withdrawal

With a reduction in locomotive hauled passenger trains and the closure of a number of yards, withdrawals began in February 1987. By October 1991 only three remained in service with SRA FreightRail. One was repainted into CountryLink livery for use as a depot shunter at the XPT Service Centre.

Disposals commenced in 1990 with three sold to the Canberra Railway Museum. Four were sold to the Manildra Group in 1991. Many were sold to Queensland sugar cane companies for conversion to  gauge. A number have also been preserved.

7301 & 7344 were placed on RailCorp's Heritage & Conservation Register. 7301 was subsequently scrapped in  January 2014.

Preserved
The following are held by recognised preservation organisations:
7307 & 7321: Owned by the Oberon Tarana Heritage Railway, both in Patrick Portlink red and yellow livery
7320 & 7324: Privately owned, currently stored in Canberra
7329 & 7335: Owned by the Dorrigo Steam Railway & Museum
7344: Owned by Transport Heritage NSW, formerly in the custody of 3801 Limited (now East Coast Heritage Rail) until 2017 and from December 2018 is in the custody of the Rail Motor Society and is based at its Paterson Depot. The unit has been repainted in the original Indian Red livery. Vigilance control and an ICE train radio have been fitted and it has also been refitted with buffers to facilitate the Society's main line operations.
7350: Owned by Transport Heritage NSW, stored at the Broadmeadow Locomotive Depot and restored for use as Depot shunter

Sold
The following units were sold for further commercial operation, some being converted to :

7304, 7306, 7308 & 7341: all stored in original condition at the former North Eton Mill shed and owned by the Mackay Sugar Limited
7305, 7328, 7330 & 7331: all rebuilt and operational at Farleigh Mill 
7309, 7336 & 7347: all stored in original condition at Kalamia Mill, Ayr
7310, 7318, 7325, 7346 & 7348: all rebuilt and operational at Invicta Mill
7313: rebuilt and operational at Pleystowe Mill
7314 & 7339: both rebuilt and operational at Proserpine Mill
7315: restored and operational at Shoalhaven Starches before being partially dismantled. Stored derelict in starch mill wagon epair sidings until 2021 when the repair siding was removed and relocated. Stored derelict goods road #2 of Bomaderry station until removed in 2022. Currentowner and location unknown. Bomaderry Formerly owned by the Manildra Group ex Canberra Railway Museum
7317: rebuilt and operational at Plane Creek Mill
7327 & 7332: both stored in derelict condition at Mackay Sugar Co-op 
7337 & 7343: both rebuilt and operational at Marian Mill
7340: restored and operational at Narranderra Mill, owned by the Manildra Group
7349: stored in original form at Pioneer Mill, Brandon
7322 & 7333: both stored and are now owned by the Manildra Group both ex CRT Group
7319 & 7322 & 7333: have been purchased by a local company in Goulburn and are currently stored in the Goulburn Locomotive Depot with 7333 being restored to operating condition inside the roundhouse
7334: is for sale in 2018. https://www.machines4u.com.au/search/Railway+Shunt+Tractor/

See also
Queensland Railways DH class
Victorian Railways Y class (diesel)

References

Further reading

Bo-Bo locomotives
Diesel-hydraulic locomotives of Australia
Diesel locomotives of New South Wales
Railway locomotives introduced in 1970
Walkers Limited locomotives
Standard gauge locomotives of Australia